The Men's 4x200 Free Relay swimming event at the 2009 SEA Games was held in December 2009.

Results

Final

External links
Video of final

References

Swimming at the 2009 Southeast Asian Games